Boteni is a commune in Argeș County, Muntenia, Romania. It is composed of four villages: Balabani, Boteni, Lunca and Muscel.

Natives
Petre Țuțea

References

Communes in Argeș County
Localities in Muntenia